Bernhard Windscheid (26 June 1817 – 26 October 1892) was a German jurist and a member of the pandectistic school of law thought.

He became famous with his essay on the concept of a legal action, which sparkled a debate with  that is said to have initiated the studies of the processal law as we know it today. Windscheid's thesis established the modern German law concept of Anspruch (roughly, a legally enforceable claim), distinguishing it from the Roman law concept of actio.

His principal work was his Lehrbuch des Pandektenrechts, and this was the main source of inspiration for the German Civil Code – the BGB. Between 1873 and 1883, Windscheid was part of the commission in charge of the drafting of the German Civil Code.

Additionally, Windscheid worked as a teacher at several universities in Germany and Switzerland, including Basel, Greifswald, München, Heidelberg, and Leipzig.

Family 
Bernhard Windscheid married the artist Auguste Eleanore Charlotte "Lotte" Pochhammer (1830–1918) on 4 November 1858. Four recorded children resulted from this marriage. The eldest, Käthe Windscheid (1859–1943) achieved prominence as a women's rights activist and as a pioneer of women's education.  (1862–1910) was also something of a pioneer in his chosen field: he was a neurologist. The younger two children, Charlotte and Margarete, were twins.

Published works
A full bibliography of Windscheid is provided by Felix Klein. His major works include:

 
 
 
 
 
 
 
 
 
 3. ed., Düsseldorf 1870. Vol. I, Vol. II and Vol. III (in German).
 5. ed., Stuttgart 1879. Vol. I, Vol. II and Vol. III (in German).
 6. ed., Frankfurt 1887. Vol. I, Vol. II and Vol. III (in German).
 9. ed., Leipzig, 1906, ed. by Theodor Kipp, is the edition usually cited.

References

Further reading 
 Ulrich Falk: Ein Gelehrter wie Windscheid : Erkundungen auf den Feldern der sogenannten Bergriffsjurisprudenz (1999)
 Gabor Hamza: "Entstehung und Entwicklung der modernen Privatrechtsordnungen und die römischrechtliche Tradition", Budapest 2009, 193-199. pp.
Leipzig University (German)

1817 births
1892 deaths
Academic staff of the University of Greifswald
People from Düsseldorf
German legal scholars
Jurists from North Rhine-Westphalia